Escondido Lake (Spanish: Lago Escondido) is a lake in Argentina. There is a settlement called Lago Escondido.

External links

Lakes of Tierra del Fuego Province, Argentina
Isla Grande de Tierra del Fuego